James Albert Noe Sr. (December 21, 1890October 18, 1976) was an American businessman and politician from Louisiana, who was briefly the 43rd Governor of Louisiana following the death of Oscar K. Allen in 1936.

Noe was born on December 21, 1890, near West Point, Kentucky. He made his fortune in oil and ran for the Louisiana State Senate at the request of Huey Long. He was chosen as president pro tempore of the senate and succeeded to the governorship to finish out Allen's term, since the lieutenant governor had been elected to the state Supreme Court.

During his brief term in office, he appointed Huey Long's widow, Rose McConnell Long, to fill his seat in the U.S. Senate. He also worked on obtaining federal money for state highways and establishing a state welfare office.

Noe ran unsuccessfully for governor in 1940 and 1959 but had more success in his business ventures. Following his governorship, Noe founded WNOE in New Orleans, Louisiana and KNOE in Monroe, Louisiana, both named in his honor.

Noe died in Houston, Texas, on October 18, 1976 from complications from a heart condition. His son, James A. Noe, Jr., succeeded him in running the family-owned radio and television stations.

Notes

References
 Davis, Edwin Adams (1961). Louisiana: The Pelican State. Baton Rouge: Louisiana State University Press. LCCN 59:9008.
 "James Albert Noe" in A Dictionary of Louisiana Biography, vol. 2 (1988), p. 607.
 Who's Who in America, 1976–77
 Miriam G. Reeves, The Governors of Louisiana
 James A. Noe obituary, New Orleans Times-Picayune, October 19, 1976

External links
Obituary of James Noe Jr. from Times-Picayune
State of Louisiana - biography
Cemetery Memorial by La-Cemeteries
Arcane Radio Trivia biography

Democratic Party governors of Louisiana
1890 births
1976 deaths
Politicians from Monroe, Louisiana
Democratic Party Louisiana state senators
American energy industry businesspeople
Farmers from Louisiana
American radio company founders
People from Harrison County, Indiana
People from Hardin County, Kentucky
United States Army officers
American military personnel of World War I
20th-century American politicians